"Wild One" is a song written by Dave Appell, Kal Mann and Bernie Lowe, and performed by Bobby Rydell. Session drummer Gary Chester played on the recording, which was released as a single in 1960.

Chart performance
The song became a big hit for Rydell, spending 16 weeks on the Billboard Hot 100 peaking at No. 2, and was kept from the No. 1 position by "Theme from A Summer Place" by Percy Faith. The song also peaked at No. 10 on the R&B chart. Outside the US, "Wild One" went to No. 7 in the United Kingdom, No. 11 in Australia, and No. 2 in Canada, co-charting with "Little Bitty Girl".

Chart performance

References

1960 singles
Bobby Rydell songs
Songs written by Bernie Lowe
Songs with lyrics by Kal Mann
Songs written by Dave Appell
1960 songs
Cameo Records singles